Sherwood may refer to:

Places

Australia
Sherwood, Queensland, a suburb of Brisbane
Sherwood, South Australia, a locality
Shire of Sherwood, a former local government area of Queensland
Electoral district of Sherwood, an electoral district from 1950 to 1992

Canada
Sherwood, Calgary, Alberta, a neighborhood
Sherwood (Edmonton), Alberta, a neighborhood
Sherwood Park, the seat of Strathcona County, Alberta
Sherwood, Ontario, a community in Huron Shores, Ontario
Sherwood, Ontario, a community in Maple, Ontario
Sherwood, Nova Scotia, a community
Sherwood, Prince Edward Island, a neighborhood of Charlottetown
Rural Municipality of Sherwood No. 159, Saskatchewan

United Kingdom
Sherwood Forest, north of the city of Nottingham, England; the place where the legendary Robin Hood is said to have lived
Sherwood, Nottingham, a residential area of Nottingham
Sherwood (UK Parliament constituency)

United States

Lakes
Lake Sherwood (California), a reservoir
Lake Sherwood (Kansas)
Lake Sherwood (West Virginia), a reservoir

Settlements
Sherwood, Arkansas, a city
Lake Sherwood, California, a gated community 
Sherwood, Iowa, an unincorporated community
Sherwood, Maryland, an unincorporated community
Sherwood, Michigan, a village
Sherwood Township, Michigan
Sherwood, New York, a hamlet
Sherwood, North Dakota, a city
Sherwood, Defiance County, Ohio, a village
Sherwood, Hamilton County, Ohio, a census-designated place
Sherwood, Oregon, a city
Sherwood, Tennessee, an unincorporated community
Sherwood, Texas, a ghost town
Sherwood, West Virginia, an unincorporated community
Sherwood, Wisconsin, a village
Sherwood (town), Wisconsin, a town
Sherwood (community), Wisconsin, an unincorporated community

Businesses
Sherwood (company), a manufacturer of hi-fi equipment
Sher-Wood, a maker of ice hockey equipment
Sherwood Pictures, a Christian film production company

Schools
Sherwood College, Nainital, India
Sherwood High School (disambiguation)
Sherwood Academy, Gedling, Nottinghamshire, England

People
Sherwood (surname)
Sherwood (given name)
John Sherwood Dixon (1896-1973), American politician
 Dominic Sherwood

Other uses
Project Sherwood, the codename for a United States program in controlled nuclear fusion
, a Second World War Royal Navy destroyer
Sherwood number, a mass-transfer number
Sherwood (band), an American rock band
Sherwood (EP)
Sherwood (2019 TV series), animated series that reimagines Robin Hood as dystopic science-fiction
Sherwood (2022 TV series), British crime series set in Nottinghamshire
Sherwood Baptist Church, Albany, Georgia
Sherwood Station (disambiguation)

See also
Sherwood Forest (disambiguation)
William of Sherwood, medieval logician
Justice Sherwood (disambiguation)